The World's 100 most threatened species is a compilation of the most threatened animals, plants, and fungi in the world. It was the result of a collaboration between over 8,000 scientists from the International Union for Conservation of Nature Species Survival Commission (IUCN SSC), along with the Zoological Society of London. The report was published by the Zoological Society of London in 2012 as the book, Priceless or Worthless?

While all the species on the list are threatened with extinction, the scientists who chose them had another criterion: all the species have no obvious benefit for humans and therefore humans have no vested interests trying to save them. Iconic and charismatic species, such as tigers and pandas—along with economically important species—have many defenders, while these apparently "worthless" species had none. The title of the report, "Priceless or Worthless?", is based on that shared quality of the species. The report's co-author, Ellen Butcher, stated one of the guiding principles of the list, "If we take immediate action we can give them a fighting chance for survival. But this requires society to support the moral and ethical position that all species have an inherent right to exist."

The report was released in Jeju, South Korea, on September 11, 2012, at the quadrennial meeting of IUCN, the World Conservation Congress. At the Congress, it was reported that scientists are finding it more and more common to have to justify funding for protection of species by showing what the human benefits would be. Jonathan Baillie, of the Zoological Society of London and co-author of the report, stated that, "The donor community and conservation movement are increasingly leaning towards a 'what can nature do for us?' approach, where species and wild habitats are valued and prioritised according to these services they provided for people. This has made it increasingly difficult for conservationists to protect the most threatened species on the planet."

Some of the threatened species are down to only a handful of surviving members. Santa Catarina's guinea pig, native to a single island in Brazil, is down to its last 40–60 individuals, reduced by hunting and habitat disturbance. The great Indian bustard is threatened by habitat loss resulting from agriculture and human development, and is down to the last 50–249 individuals. Elaeocarpus bojeri, a flowering plant found only on the island of Mauritius, has fewer than 10 surviving individuals, because of loss of habitat. The Baishan fir (Abies beshanzuensis), native to China, is down to five surviving mature individuals. "Priceless or Worthless?" describes the threats that each species is facing, along with measures that would aid their survival.

Species list

See also

 The World's 25 Most Endangered Primates
 Lists of organisms by population

References

External links
 IUCN Species Survival Commission

Conservation biology
Endangered species
International Union for Conservation of Nature
Lists of superlatives